The Milagro Beanfield War is a 1988 American comedy-drama film directed by Robert Redford from a screenplay written by John Nichols and David S. Ward based on Nichols's novel of the same name. The ensemble cast includes Ruben Blades, Richard Bradford, Sônia Braga, Julie Carmen, James Gammon, Melanie Griffith, John Heard, Carlos Riquelme, Daniel Stern, Chick Vennera, and Christopher Walken.

Filmed on location in Truchas, New Mexico, the film is set in the fictional rural town of Milagro, with a population of 426, a predominantly Hispanic and Catholic town, with a largely interrelated population.

The film tells of one man's struggle as he defends his small beanfield and his community against much larger business and state political interests.

On September 29, 2020, Kino Lorber released the film on Blu-ray.

Plot

Nearly 500 residents of the agricultural community of Milagro in the mountains of northern New Mexico face a crisis when politicians and business interests make a backroom deal to usurp the town's water in order to pave the way for a land buy-out. Due to the new laws, Joe Mondragon is unable to make a living farming because he is not allowed to divert water from an irrigation ditch that runs past his property.

Frustrated, and unable to find work, Joe visits his father's field. He happens upon a tag that reads "prohibited" covering a valve on the irrigation ditch. He kicks the valve, unintentionally breaking it, allowing water to flood his fields. He decides against repairing the valve and instead decides to plant beans in the field. This leads to a confrontation with powerful state interests, including a hired gun brought in from out of town.

An escalation of events follows, leading to a final showdown between law enforcement and the citizens of Milagro.

Cast
 Rubén Blades as Sheriff Bernabe Montoya
 Richard Bradford as Ladd Devine
 Sônia Braga as Ruby Archuleta
 Julie Carmen as Nancy Mondragon
 James Gammon as "Horsethief Shorty" Wilson
 Melanie Griffith as Flossie Devine
 John Heard as Charlie Bloom
 Carlos Riquelme as Amarante Cordova
 Daniel Stern as Herbie Platt
 Chick Vennera as Joe Mondragon
 Christopher Walken as Kyril Montana
 Freddy Fender as Mayor Sammy Cantú
 Tony Genaro as Nick Rael
 Jerry Hardin as Emerson Capps
 Robert Carricart as Coyote Angel

Production
According to an article by Patricia Rodriguez in the Fort Worth Star-Telegram, Robert Redford was interested in filming part of the movie in the Plaza del Cerro of Chimayo, New Mexico, which is argued to be the last surviving fortified Spanish plaza in North America. Some locals responded favorably, but many objected to the idea of big business changing the small community, which forced Redford to film the movie in Truchas.

In his essay, "Night of the Living Beanfield: How an Unsuccessful Cult Novel Became an Unsuccessful Cult Film in Only Fourteen Years, Eleven Nervous Breakdowns, and $20 Million," John Nichols gives an account of the film project as he saw it. Nichols also described the origin of the novel and the making of the film in the biographical documentary, The Milagro Man: The Irrepressible Multicultural Life and Literary Times of John Nichols, which premiered at the 2012 Albuquerque Film Festival.

Reception

Box office
The film's premiere in three cities was called "risky" and "disappointing" by industry analysts.

Critical response

The film received mixed reviews from critics. Vincent Canby, film critic for The New York Times, believes the film missed its mark, and wrote, "The screenplay, by David Ward and John Nichols, based on Mr. Nichols's novel, is jammed with underdeveloped, would-be colorful characters, including a philosophical Chicano angel, who face a succession of fearful confrontations with the law that come to nothing. The narrative is a veritable fiesta of anticlimaxes, from the time the sun sets at the beginning of the film until it sets, yet again, behind the closing credits."

Roger Ebert also gave the film a mixed review and had problems with the film's context, writing, "The result is a wonderful fable, but the problem is, some of the people in the story know it's a fable and others do not. This causes an uncertainty that runs all through the film, making it hard to weigh some scenes against others. There are characters who seem to belong in an angry documentary—like Devine, who wants to turn Milagro into a plush New Mexico resort town. And then there are characters who seem to come from a more fanciful time, like Mondragon, whose original rebellion is more impulsive than studied."

Critic Richard Scheib liked the film's direction and the characters portrayed. He wrote, "Redford arrays a colorfully earthy ensemble of characters. The plot falls into place with lazy, deceptive ease. Redford places it up against a gently barbed level of social commentary, although this is something that comes surprisingly light-heartedly. There’s an enchantment to the film – at times it is a more successful version of the folklore fable that Francis Ford Coppola's Finian's Rainbow (1968) tried to be but failed."

Scheib believes the film is "one of the first American films to fall into the Latin American tradition of magical realism. This is a genre that usually involves an earthily naturalistic, often highly romanticized, blend of the supernatural and whimsical."

The review aggregator Rotten Tomatoes reported that 61% of critics gave the film a positive rating, based on 33 reviews. The consensus states: "Arguably Robert Redford's most inchoate work, The Milagro Beanfield War has plenty of beautiful moments, but they don't quite add up to a worthwhile whole."

The film was screened out of competition at the 1988 Cannes Film Festival.

Accolades
Wins
 Academy Awards: Oscar; Best Music, Original Score, Dave Grusin; 1989.
 Political Film Society: PFS Award; Democracy; 1989.

Nominations
 Golden Globes: Golden Globe; Best Original Score - Motion Picture, Dave Grusin; 1989.
 Political Film Society: PFS Award; Exposé; 1989.

Soundtrack
Veteran jazz pianist and composer Dave Grusin contributed the film's original music. A formal soundtrack album has never been released, although tracks from the score were included as a bonus suite on Grusin's 1989 album Migration.

See also

References

External links
 
 
 
 
 
 The Milagro Beanfield War film trailer on YouTube

1988 films
1980s political comedy-drama films
American political comedy-drama films
Films that won the Best Original Score Academy Award
1980s English-language films
Films scored by Dave Grusin
Films about water scarcity
Films based on American novels
Films directed by Robert Redford
Films shot in New Mexico
Films set in New Mexico
Films with screenplays by David S. Ward
Magic realism films
Films about Mexican Americans
Universal Pictures films
1988 comedy films
1988 drama films
1980s American films